Chiayi metropolitan area is the urban area surrounding Chiayi City.

Definition
According to the definition of metropolitan areas formerly used by the Republic of China government, the Chiayi metropolitan area includes the following areas:

However, since 2010, the term is no longer in official usage.

Economy 
It is a sub-urban area developed by industries such as industry, forestry, sugar, agriculture, fishery, and tourism.

References 

Metropolitan areas of Taiwan